The United States federal budget for fiscal year 2018, which ran from October 1, 2017, to September 30, 2018, was named America First: A Budget Blueprint to Make America Great Again.  It was the first budget proposed by newly elected president Donald Trump, submitted to the 115th Congress on March 16, 2017.

The government was initially funded through a series of five temporary continuing resolutions.  The final funding package was passed as an omnibus spending bill, the Consolidated Appropriations Act, 2018, enacted on March 23, 2018.

Background
Donald Trump was elected as President of the United States in the November 8, 2016 election, campaigning for the Republican Party on a platform of tax cuts and projects like the Mexican border wall. During his campaign, Trump promised to cut federal spending and taxes for individuals and corporations.

Trump administration budget proposal
 
The Trump administration proposed its 2018 budget on February 27, 2017, ahead of his address to Congress, outlining $54 billion in cuts to federal agencies and an increase in defense spending. On March 16, 2017, President Trump sent his budget proposal to Congress, remaining largely unchanged from the initial proposal. The OMB estimated FY2018 would involve outlays of $4.094 trillion and revenues of $3.654 trillion, a $440 billion deficit. The 2018–2027 period planned $48.901T in outlays and $45.751T in revenues, a $3.15T deficit.

CBO scoring of the budget

The Congressional Budget Office reported its evaluation of the budget on July 13, 2017, including its effects over the 2018–2027 period.
Mandatory spending: The budget cuts mandatory spending by a net $2.033 trillion (T) over the 2018–2027 period. This includes reduced spending of $1.891T for healthcare, mainly due to the proposed repeal and replacement of the Affordable Care Act (ACA/Obamacare); $238 billion (B) in income security ("welfare"); and $100 billion in reduced subsidies for student loans. These savings would be partially offset by $200B in additional infrastructure investment.
Discretionary spending: The budget cuts discretionary spending by a net $1.851 trillion over the 2018–2027 period. This includes reduced spending of $752 billion for overseas contingency operations (defense spending in Afghanistan and other foreign countries), which is partially offset by other increases in defense spending of $448B, for a net defense cut of $304B. Other discretionary spending (cabinet departments) would be reduced by $1.548T.
Revenues would be reduced by $1 trillion, mainly by repealing the ACA, which had applied higher tax rates to the top 5% of income earners. Trump's budget proposal was not sufficiently specific to score other tax proposals; these were simply described as "deficit neutral" by the Administration.
Deficits: CBO estimated that based on the policies in place as of the start of the Trump administration, the debt increase over the 2018–2027 period would be $10.112T. If all of President Trump's proposals were implemented, CBO estimated that the sum of the deficits (debt increases) for the 2018–2027 period would be reduced by $3.276T, resulting in $6.836T in total debt added over the period.
CBO estimated that the debt held by the public, the major subset of the national debt, would rise from $14.168T (77.0% GDP) in 2016 to $22.337T (79.8% GDP) in 2027 under the President's budget.

Department and program changes

The proposed 2018 budget includes $54 billion in cuts to federal departments, and a corresponding increase in defense and military spending.

The $971 million budget for arts and cultural agencies, including the Corporation for Public Broadcasting, National Endowment for the Arts, and National Endowment for the Humanities, would be eliminated entirely.

Criticism
A recipient of the Nobel Memorial Prize in Economic Sciences, economist Joseph Stiglitz said about the 2018 budget proposal: "Trump's budget takes a sledgehammer to what remains of the American Dream". Senator Bernie Sanders also criticized the proposal: "This is a budget which says that if you are a member of the Trump family, you may receive a tax break of up to $4 billion, but if you are a child of a working-class family, you could well lose the health insurance you currently have through the Children's Health Insurance Program and massive cuts to Medicaid". The actual text of the budget blueprint did not seem to include any cuts to CHIP or Medicaid at the time; however, the ultimate Senate bill stipulates that extension of CHIP funding will not increase the deficit, while not mentioning Medicaid, which did not require extension for FY2018.

Congressional budget resolution 
On October 17, 2017, the Senate started to debate the 2018 proposed budget. On October 19, 2017, Senator Heidi Heitkamp (D-N.D.) proposed an amendment to prevent tax increases on people making less than $250,000 a year. It would have also required the Senate to approve a tax-reform bill with 60 votes rather than a simple majority. Senate Budget Committee Chairman Mike Enzi (R-Wyo.) called this language a “poison pill,” and the amendment was defeated 51-47. Several Republican amendments were adopted with broad support. Senator Jeff Flake (R-Ariz.) proposed language to make the “American tax system simpler and fairer for all Americans,” which passed 98-0. Senator Marco Rubio (R-Fla.) proposed an amendment in support of increasing the child tax credit, which passed by voice vote, meaning it was approved without any Senator raising an issue. Senator John McCain (R-Ariz.), chairman of the Senate Armed Services Committee, offered an amendment to ensure increases in federal defense spending are prioritized over increases in spending in other areas. “Defense and nondefense are not of the same urgency,” he told reporters Thursday. ”

Related fiscal legislation

Appropriations 
On September 8, 2017, Trump signed the Continuing Appropriations Act, 2018 and Supplemental Appropriations for Disaster Relief Requirements Act, 2017. The bill contained a continuing resolution and a suspension of the debt ceiling lasting until December 8, as well as additional disaster funding for FY2017.  Two additional continuing resolutions were passed: the Further Continuing Appropriations Act, 2018 funding the government through December 22, 2017, and the Further Additional Continuing Appropriations Act, 2018 funding it through January 19, 2018.

As of January 19, 2018, the Extension of Continuing Appropriations Act, 2018 was under consideration to extend funding through February 16, 2018. The failure of the bill to pass the Senate led to the first federal government shutdown of 2018.

On Friday, February 9, funding lapsed again at midnight after Senator Rand Paul delayed the vote on the Bipartisan Budget Act of 2018, which included another continuing resolution, by objecting to measures requiring unanimous consent to expedite the parliamentary process. In addition, its passage was uncertain in the House due to opposition by both fiscal conservatives who objected to the increased deficit spending, and by liberals who opposed the omission of a DACA provision. However, it passed the Senate 71–28 and the House 240–186 after midnight, and President Trump signed the bill early that morning, prior to when furloughs were to begin.  In all, the funding gap lasted nine hours.

On the evening of March 21, 2018, the text of the Consolidated Appropriations Act, 2018 was released, with Congress expecting to approve it within two days. In March 2018, the House passed the legislation in a 256–167 vote and the Senate with 65–32. President Trump signed it into law on 23 March 2018.

Revenue 
On December 20, 2017, Congress passed the Tax Cuts and Jobs Act of 2017, two days after which President Trump signed it into law. It made changes to personal and commercial income taxes, among other changes, taking effect in January 2018. After accounting for macroeconomic feedback effects, the Joint Committee on Taxation estimates that it will add a net of approximately $1 trillion to the federal debt over the period 2018–2027.

Total revenue

Receipts

Receipts by source: (in billions of dollars)

Deficit
There was a deficit of $779 billion in the 2018 fiscal year, the highest in six years, despite the fact that the Administration requested a $100 billion decrease in the deficit instead.

References

External links
 Appropriations for Fiscal Year 2018

United States federal budget
United States federal budget
2018
115th United States Congress